Paris-Manhattan is a French comedy film, which premiered on 2 April 2012 at the Festival of French Cinema in Australia. This is the first feature film by writer-director Sophie Lellouche.

Plot 

Alice Ovitz is a pharmacist from a Jewish family, who during her early years was introduced to and fell in love with Woody Allen's films. Growing up, she strongly desires a relationship, but the only man she ever loved was taken away from her by her own sister. On Alice's bedroom wall hangs a huge poster of Woody Allen, with whom she has long night conversations, and he talks back to her through excerpts of dialogue from his films.

Ten years go by. Alice has taken over her father's pharmacy after he retired, her sister is long married to the man she stole from Alice, and the poster still hangs over the bed. She is thirty, and lonely, and her family is trying its best to introduce her to unmarried men. She is having a hard time choosing from two emerging suitors, Vincent and Victor. Almost by accident, but with help of Victor, Alice eventually  meets Woody Allen on the streets of Paris. This time, the real Woody Allen, not the voice of the Poster, gives her personal advice, which happens to be exactly what Alice considered doing anyway.

Cast 
 Alice Taglioni as Alice Ovitz
 Patrick Bruel as Victor
 Marine Delterme as Hélène
 Michel Aumont as Isaac Ovitz
 Marie-Christine Adam as Nicole Ovitz
 Louis-Do de Lencquesaing as Pierre
 Margaux Châtelier as Laura
  as Vincent
 Woody Allen as himself

Release 
The film was released in Germany on 4 October 2012.

Reception 
Reviews for Paris Manhattan have been mixed. Boyd van Hoeij of Variety noted its similarity to Woody Allen's own 1972 film Play It Again, Sam, stating that "This update-cum-ripoff might be aiming for witty and romantic, but it's mostly a hollow, rambling effort leavened with some stargazing".

References

External links 
 
 

2012 films
Films about Jews and Judaism
French romantic comedy films
Cultural depictions of Woody Allen
Films set in Paris
2010s French films